The 1950 Little All-America college football team is composed of college football players from small colleges and universities who were selected by the Associated Press (AP) as the best players at each position. For 1950, the AP selected first and second teams.

First team
 Back - Brad Rowland, McMurry
 Back - Carl Taseff, John Carroll
 Back - Richard Doyne, Lehigh
 Back - Robert Miller, Emory & Henry
 End - Norb Hecker, Baldwin-Wallace
 End - Benard Calendar, Louisiana College
 Tackle - Sal Gero, Elon
 Tackle - Cal Roberts, Gusvavus Adolphus
 Guard - Jack Hawkins, Central Washington
 Guard - Ed Douglas, New Hampshire
 Center - Charles Cope, Franklin & Marshall

Second team
 Back - John Ford, Hardin-Simmons
 Back - Joseph Pahr, Valparaiso
 Back - John Phillips, Mississippi Southern
 Back - Everett Tiland, Western Washington
 End - Richard Forbes, St. Ambrose
 End - Charles Sanger, Emporia State
 Tackle - Bozo Weir, Presbyterian
 Tackle - Tom Staszak, Drexel
 Guard - E.J. Moore, Abilene Christian
 Guard - Leon McCoy, Morris Harvey
 Center - Richard Daniels, Pacific Lutheran

See also
 1950 College Football All-America Team

References

Little All-America college football team
Little All-America college football teams